Cape Alexandra is a cape which forms the northwest extremity of South Georgia. The name Cape Alexandra dates back to about 1912 and commemorates Queen Alexandra, Consort of King Edward VII of the United Kingdom.

References 

Headlands of South Georgia